Arun Date (4 May 1934 – 6 May 2018) was a well known Marathi singer of Bhavageete.

Career
Originally a textile engineer from VJTI, Mumbai, Arun left his high-profile job after 28 years of service for pursuing a career in singing. His song "Shukratara" was adjudged as song of the month by Mumbai Radio Station in 1962. Arun was first recipient of Gajananrao Vatave Puraskar.

Personal life
Arun Date's brother, Ravi Date, is a well-known tabla player.

References 

1934 births
2018 deaths
Indian male singers
Musicians from Mumbai
Place of birth missing